Tapan Kanti Ghosh is a Bangladeshi bureaucrat and senior secretary of the Ministry of Commerce. He is the vice-chairman of Bangladesh Foreign Trade Institute.

Early life 

Ghosh was born in Paikgachha Upazila, Khulna District and completed his SSC from Haridhali Union Secondary School in 1979. He completed his HSC from Brajalal College in 1981. He completed his bachelors and masters from the University of Dhaka in economics.

Career 

Ghosh joined the Bangladesh Civil Service in 1989 in the administration branch.

Ghosh was the commercial counselor at the Bangladesh Embassy in Brussels from 2011 to 2016.

In 2016, Ghosh joined the Export Wing at the Ministry of Commerce as a joint secretary and later would be promoted to additional secretary. From 7 July 2020 to 2 June 2021, Ghosh was the secretary of the Ministry of Liberation War Affairs after which he was made the secretary of the Ministry of Commerce. Khaja Miah replaced him as the secretary at the Ministry of Liberation War Affairs. He replaced Md. Zafar Uddin at the Ministry of Commerce who was sent into retirement. In August, he presided over a meeting of the Global Alliance for Improved Nutrition which took place at the Directorate of National Consumer Rights Protection. On 16 November 2021, he was made the member secretary of the committee formed to celebrate the 50th independence of Bangladesh. On 30 December 2021, Ghosh was promoted to Senior Secretary.

On 25 August 2021, Ghosh met with traders and businessmen in an attempt to reduce the price of essential commodities. He oversaw the export of more than two thousand tone of Hilsa fish to West Bengal on the occasion of Durga Puja which he described as a diplomatic action. In December 2021, he announced the government was moving towards establishing preferential trade agreement with Nepal.

In 2022, Ghosh proposed the name of Amir Hamza for the Independence Day Award, the highest civilian award in Bangladesh, for his contribution to literature and who was selected. Hamza was the father of Asaduzzaman, bureaucrat and the chief executive of Khulna District Council, who successfully lobbied to have his father's name included with the endorsement of Ghosh. Hamza's name was met with criticism due to questions about the significance of his contribution and the fact the Hamza had been sentenced to life imprisonment in a murder case. His name was eventually removed the list of awardees following criticism.

Ghosh started the refund process for Qcoom.com, an online retailer which had failed to deliver products after payment. He was also working with Evaly, another online retailer which was facing difficulties providing orders and paying suppliers, to solve their financial problems. He also moved to reduce/remove the vat on soybean oil to reduce prices of soybean oil in the market. On 13 February 2022, Ghosh announced plans to amend the Company Act. On 4 March 2022, he met the commerce secretary of India, B. V. R. Subrahmanyam.

References 

Living people
People from Khulna District
University of Dhaka alumni
Bangladeshi civil servants
Year of birth missing (living people)